A lowland is  portion of a plain that has a low elevation.

Lowland, Lowlands, or The Lowlands may refer also to:

Places

Europe 

Scottish Lowlands, a cultural and historic region of Scotland
Central Lowlands, a geographic subdivision of Scotland
North European Plain, also Northern European Lowlands, a region of Europe between the Central Highlands and the North Sea
Low Countries, the part that lies in the Netherlands, Belgium and (by extension) Luxembourg
Silesian Lowlands, the part that lies in Poland
Meshchera Lowlands, of Western Russia
Samogitia, one of the five ethnographic regions of Lithuania
Central Swedish lowland

North America

Arctic Lowlands, of Northern Canada
Caribbean Lowlands, the low-lying eastern side of Mesoamerican countries
Eastern Ridges and Lowlands, a region of Eastern Wisconsin
Hudson Bay Lowlands, also of Northern Canada
Lowland, North Carolina, a community in Pamlico County, North Carolina
Rasmussen Lowlands, a region of Northern Canada
Saint Lawrence Lowlands, a region of North American containing the Great Lakes

Music
Lowlands (festival), annual Dutch music festival
Lowlands (album), a 2000 album by Susan McKeown

Other
Lowlands (1922 film), a German silent film
Tiefland (film) (Lowlands), a 1954 film directed by Leni Riefenstahl
Tiefland (opera) (Lowlands), a 1903 opera composed by Eugen d'Albert
, a British cargo ship in service 1947–59
The Lowland, a 2013 novel by Jhumpa Lahiri

See also
Lowlander (disambiguation)